The Collected Stories of Eudora Welty is a collection of short stories by Eudora Welty, first published by Houghton Mifflin in 1980. Its first paperback edition (Harvest Books) won a 1983 U.S. National Book Award.

Collected Stories demonstrates the author's ability to write from the point of view of diverse characters ranging from Aaron Burr to a deaf black servant boy, a traveling salesman, eccentric Southern matrons, and countless others.

Notes

References

1982 short story collections
Short story collections by Eudora Welty
National Book Award for Fiction winning works
Houghton Mifflin books